Pampur railway station is the railway station on the Jammu–Baramulla line in the Indian union territory of Jammu and Kashmir. It is one of the four stations in Pulwama district, the others being Awantipora railway station, Kakapora railway station and Panchgam railway station respectively.

Location
The station is situated in notified area of Pampore, Pulwama, Jammu and Kashmir. It belongs to the North Central Railway Zone of Indian Railways.

History

The station has been built as part of the Jammu–Baramulla line megaproject, intending to link the Kashmir Valley with Jammu Tawi and the rest of the Indian railway network.

Design
The station features Kashmiri wood architecture, with an intended ambiance of a royal court designed to complement the local surroundings of the station. Station signage is predominantly in Urdu, English and Hindi.

Reduced level
The R.L. of the station is 1592 m above mean sea level.

See also
Srinagar railway station

References

Railway stations in Pulwama district
Firozpur railway division